The 1912 United States presidential election in New Mexico took place on November 5, 1912, and all contemporary forty-eight states participated as part of the 1912 United States presidential election. Voters chose three electors to represent them in the Electoral College, which voted for President and Vice President.

This was the first presidential election in which New Mexico participated, having been admitted to the union as the 47th state on January 6, 1912.

Background
During the period between New Mexico's annexation by the United States and statehood, the area was divided between largely Republican machine-run highland regions and its firmly Southern Democrat and Baptist "Little Texas" region to the southeast. Running for reelection against the reformist policies of Wilson was William H. Taft, who secured the Republican nomination over Theodore Roosevelt. To counter not receiving the Republican nomination, Roosevelt then ran for president under his own Bull-Moose Party.

Vote
New Mexico is indicative of this critical split in the industrialist Republican Party, because Wilson was able to attain victory, both in the State and nationally, with about 40% of the vote, due to a split in the "Old Guard" of highland Republicanism.

New Mexico was won by New Jersey Governor Woodrow Wilson, in what was perhaps the most politically diverse election in United States history. Nonetheless, New Mexico was still Taft's fourth-strongest state by vote percentage after Utah, New Hampshire and Vermont, reflecting the strong Hispanic machine loyalties to him in the northern highlands. The Socialist Party of America had its best year on record under Socialist Party star Eugene V. Debs, who garnered almost six percent of the electorate in New Mexico, and nationally.

Results

Results by county

Notes

References

New Mexico
United States presidential
1912